Varzim Sport Club is a Portuguese football team based in Póvoa de Varzim, near Porto in the north of the country. The club was founded on 25 December 1915, and has played at the Estádio do Varzim Sport Club since it was founded. The club plays in the second tier Liga Portugal 2,  after winning promotion from the Campeonato Nacional in 2015. The club has played for a total of 21 seasons at the top level of Portuguese football, eight in a row from 1963. It reached the semi-finals of the Taça de Portugal (league cup) on three occasions, in 1978, 1980 and 1985.

Varzim has won six major titles in its history, which include the Segunda Divisão four times and the Terceira Divisão and Liga Intercalar once. The club usually plays with over 70% of players from its youth ranks. The club youth academy is notable for producing Portuguese international footballers like António Lima Pereira, Bruno Alves, Hélder Postiga and Salvador Agra.

History
The club was founded on 25 December 1915 under the name Varzim Foot-Ball Club. On 25 March 1916, the club approved a motion to change its name to Varzim Sport Club. Following the name change, black and white were chosen as the colours for the club's kits in all sports. In 1918, the club joined the Porto Football Association, where it officially became recognised as a club and started to compete in the city's football league. In 1920, the club won its first trophy, the Taça Eça de Queiroz.

Following several seasons playing in the amateur leagues, the club gained promotion to the top-flight Primeira Liga in 1963, where it remained for 13 seasons before being relegated. Since then, the club has suffered mixed results after several promotions and relegations. In the club's most recent history, it suffered relegation in the 2010–11 Liga de Honra to the non-professional leagues for the first time in 15 years.

Varzim won the Segunda Divisão in the 2011–12 season. It started its campaign in the II Divisão Zona Norte 2011–12, where it won the league comprehensively with 68 points, 14 more than the second-placed Fafe. In topping the group, the club qualified for the playoffs where two of the three sides would be promoted to the Liga de Honra. It fought off competition from Tondela and Fátima to finish top of the group and claim its fourth Segunda Divisão title. Midfielder André André was praised for his displays for the club in which he scored 12 goals in 33 appearances during the season.

Varzim did not compete in the 2012–13 Segunda Liga season as they did not pay the €600,000 registration fee. They remained in the third tier until earning promotion in June 2015 with a 3–1 aggregate play-off win over Casa Pia. Varzim remained in the second division until May 2022, when they were relegated in second-last above Académica de Coimbra.

Honours
 Segunda Divisão
 Winners (4): 1962–63, 1975–76, 1995–96, 2011–12
 Terceira Divisão
 Winners (1): 1961–62
 Liga Intercalar
 Winners (1): 2007–08

Players

Current squad

On loan

Notable former managers

 José Maria Pedroto (1965-1966)
 José Torres (1982–1984)
 Félix Mourinho (1984–1985)
 Henrique Calisto (1985–1988)
 António Fidalgo (1988–1989)
 Manuel de Oliveira (1989–1990)
 Henrique Calisto (1990)
 Eurico Gomes (1990–1991)
 Ruben Cunha (1991)
 Bernardino Pedroto (1991–1992)
 Álvaro Carolino (1992)
 Ruben Cunha (1992–1993)
 Nicolau Vaqueiro (1993–1994)
 Horácio Gonçalves (1994–1998)
 José Alberto Torres (1998–1999)
 Rogério Gonçalves (1999–2002)
 José Alberto Costa (2002)
 Luís Campos (2002–2003)
 Rogério Gonçalves (2003–2004)
 Abílio Novais (2004)
 José Dinis (2004–2005)
 Horácio Gonçalves (2005–2006)
 Eduardo Esteves (2006–2007)
 Diamantino Miranda (2007–2008)
 Rui Dias (2008)
 Eduardo Esteves (2008–2011)
 Dito (2011–2012)
 Octávio Moreira (2012)
 José Augusto (2012–2014)
 Alexandre Vila Cova (2014)
 Vítor Paneira (2014–2015)
 Quim Berto (2015)
 Nuno Capucho (2015–2016)
 Armando Evangelista (2016)
 Joao Eusébio (2016–2017)
 Nuno Capucho (2017–2018)
 Fernando Valente (2018–2019)
 César Peixoto (2019)
 Paulo Alves (2019–2020)
 Miguel Leal (2020–)

Chairmen

 Dr. José Sá (1930–1935)
 João Baptista (1935–1937)
 Manuel Frasco (1937–1940)
 Dr. Armindo Graça (1940–1947)
 Manuel Dias (1947–1951)
 Luís Rodrigues (1951–1953)
 Domingos Barbosa (1953–1954)
 Manuel Frasco (1954–1955)
 Dr. Armindo Graça (1955–1956)
 Alípio Oliveira (1956–1958)
 Capitão Amílcar Monteiro (1958–1959)
 António Duarte (1959–1960)
 Dr. João Guerreiro (1960–1964)
 Dr. Armando Faria (1964–1965)
 Alípio Oliveira (1965–1966)
 Dr. Armando Faria (1966–1967)
 Fernando Castro (1967–1968)
 Eng.º António Castro (1968–1969)
 Dr. João Fernando (1969–1970)
 Manuel Pereira (1970–1971)
 Dr. Armindo Graça (1971–1972)
 Dr. João Fernando (1972–1974)
 Padre Manuel Silva (1974–1978)
 Dr. Rui Azevedo (1978–1979)
 Francisco Troina (1979–1982)
 Lídio Marques (1982–1988)
 Domingos Castro (1988–1990)
 Avelino Monte (1990–1992)
 Dr. João Fernando (1992–1994)
 Lídio Marques (1994–2000)
 João Oliveira (2000–2004)
 José Castro (2004–2012)

League and Cup history

References

External links

 
ZeroZero profile & squad
NationalFootballTeams.com profile & squad
ForaDeJogo.net profile & squad

 
Football clubs in Portugal
Association football clubs established in 1915
1915 establishments in Portugal
Primeira Liga clubs
Liga Portugal 2 clubs